Reproductive initials are filaments below the cuticle surface of algae and fungi which give rise to the bulbs of spore-producing cells (in fungi, conidiophores).

References

Algal anatomy